Making a Man is a 1922 American silent drama film produced by Adolph Zukor and Jesse L. Lasky, distributed by Paramount Pictures, and directed by Joseph Henabery. Starring Jack Holt, the film is based on the Peter B. Kyne story "Humanizing Mr. Winsby".

Plot
As described in a film magazine, small town millionaire and snob Horace Winsby (Holt) finds himself in love with his neighbor's daughter Patricia Owens (Novak), who has just returned from finishing school. He boasts of his wealth and takes it for granted that she will marry him, but instead she refuses him and says that no woman would marry him. Horace feels highly insulted and, in a rage, he forecloses on all the mortgages he holds. The farmers join forces and go to his office and demand additional time to pay. Horace is threatened and his bank manager advises him to leave town at once until the matter blows over. He goes to New York City and stays at an expensive hotel. During his stay, some crooks steal his wallet. Returning to the hotel, he is presented with the week's account but is unable to pay. He tries to wire for money but the hotel refuses him credit for the message, and he is put out into the street. In the park a bum named Shorty (Nelson) acquaints him with the ways of those down and out. He gets a job as a waiter and is there discovered by Patricia and her father Jim (Lockney) during their visit to New York City. Patricia realizes that he has become a man and accepts his marriage proposal this time.

Cast
Jack Holt as Horace Winsby
J. P. Lockney as Jim Owens
Eva Novak as Patricia Owens
Bert Woodruff as Henry Cattermole
Frank Nelson as Shorty
Robert Dudley as Bailey

Preservation status
Making a Man is now considered to be a lost film.

References

External links

Lantern slide

1922 films
Lost American films
Films directed by Joseph Henabery
Paramount Pictures films
American silent feature films
1922 drama films
Silent American drama films
American black-and-white films
1922 lost films
1920s American films
1920s English-language films
English-language drama films